Om Nom Stories (often called Om Nom) is a British-Russian web series produced by Zeptolab and Rocket Fox, featuring the character Om Nom from the video game series Cut the Rope. The series revolves around Om Nom's life out of the game, and is based on 4 games in the series: the original, Cut the Rope: Time Travel, Cut the Rope 2, and Cut the Rope: Magic. The first season, as well as the first and last episodes of the second (Time Travel), combine live action and animation, while the rest are entirely animated. As of October 14, 2022, 221 episodes have been released over 22 seasons.

About the show
This show with 5 series, 23 seasons, and 230 episodes long, it took 10 years and 2 months to finish the entire show. See how Om Nom gets delivered on Evan's house, time travel to meet his ancestors, go on the adventure in a cartoon world, get stuck in a fantasy book, travel around the world, make a video blog, dream about 10 jobs, become a superhero, be a dad with a son, open a restaurant, and go to a new neighbour! seasons 1-3 takes between 1 minute and 1 minute, 5 seconds, season 4-7 takes 2 minutes, seasons 8-23 takes 2 minutes and 45 seconds, and season 23 ep 10 takes 1 hour!

Production
The series had a pilot, and it has went viral ever since.

The show has aired on CITV in the United Kingdom between 2014 and 2017. In October 2018, the series' first five seasons were acquired by Turner Broadcasting System for distribution in Latin American regions. On August 12, 2019, the spin-off short series Learn English with Om Nom started broadcasting as part of BatteryPOP broadcasts on the former Qubo network.

Plot

The series chronicles the daily antics, exploits and adventures of Om Nom, a friendly and curious green blob-like monster who always seems to find a way into getting himself into comically absurd and surreal situations. Most episodes circulate around Om Nom trying to relax or just have fun, only for his plans to get ruined and often sidetracked by the people around him and the adventures that he gets himself into. Om Nom is usually accompanied by his girlfriend and later wife Om Nelle, their mischievous and rambunctious son Nibble Nom, and various other miscellaneous supporting characters.

The Super Noms Seasons (seasons 8-14)

One day, a superhero in space was washing his clothes when suddenly, an asteroid crashed into his ship, causing his clothes to crash-land on earth. Om Nom and Om Nelle discover his possessions and decide to put them to good use, helping to save the world and their community against numerous villains, most predominantly an evil spider who wishes to rule the world, only for the Super Noms to foil him every time. A total of 70 new episodes were produced during this period.

The Nibble Nom Seasons (seasons 15-17)
One day, Om Nom and Om Nelle are looking for danger and excitement in their superhero personas as the Super Noms, when a stork drops a package containing an adorable, yet mischievous and troublemaking child/baby named Nibble Nom whose outrageous fantasies often put Om Nom and Om Nelle at the forefront. A total of 30 new episodes were produced during this period.

The Om Nom Cafe Seasons (seasons 18-19)
The Noms' cooking skills culminate with a disaster that leaves them homeless. Just when all hope seems lost, the locals enjoyment of their food prompts them to open a new restaurant called Om Nom Cafe. There, they sell food and drinks which invariably get them into mishaps along the way. These are the last two seasons to feature Nomville and any of the characters introduced in Seasons 4-14. A total of 20 new episodes were produced during this period.

The New Neighbors Seasons (seasons 20-23)
The Noms move into a neighborhood called Nomcity featuring various new and eccentric characters. Even away from Nomville, the Noms aren't safe from being caught up in numerous comical and often absurd escapades and predicaments. 40 new episodes have currently been released during this period.

Characters

Main

 Om Nom: Om Nom is a green blob-like monster who can seemingly never escape the madness and adventures he's thrown into at the blink of an eye. While he's presented in the early seasons as mischievous, hyperactive and rambunctious to an extent, he's later established as smart, friendly and laid-back but somewhat slow-witted, impulsive and childish around Seasons 3-5. Om Nom is characterized most often though as being just as capable at getting himself into situations as much as he can get himself out of them.
 Om Nelle: Om Nelle is Om Nom's love interest and girlfriend around Seasons 4 or 5, and his wife apparently starting in Season 8 onwards. As opposed to Om Nom's bumbling persona, Om Nelle is considered and often is shown to be more capable, independent and mature then him and is often the one who corrects him and has to rescue him from his peril. In spite of their constant fights and disagreements, she and Om Nom share a loving relationship with one another. Originally being a side character, she would soon evolve into one of the main characters of the series.
 Nibble Nom: Introduced in Season 15, Om Nom and Om Nelle's son Nibble Nom characterizes Om Nom's personality in the early seasons: purely mischievous, rambunctious and hyperactive. Most of Nibble Nom's persona comes from the fantasy sequences he and Om Nom often go through, either to achieve a goal or to set a standard wtihin them. While he's often mischievous, conniving and occasionally cruel, his heart is in the right place and he matures more as the series progresses, usually playing as the straight man to Om Nom's playful behavior whenever Om Nelle isn't there to fill the role.

Series 1 (2011-2017)

Season 1: Om Nom Stories (2011-2012) 

0. Pilot: Om Nom & Cat  (December 9, 2011)

1. Strange Delivery  (October 24, 2012)

2. Bath Time  (November 8, 2012)

3. Favourite Food  (November 15, 2012)

4. Candy Prescription  (November 22, 2012)

5. Halloween Special  (October 31, 2012)

6. Magic Tricks  (November 29, 2012)

7. Arts and Crafts  (December 6, 2012)

8. Candy Can  (December 13, 2012)

9. Christmas Special  (December 20, 2012)

10. Robo Friend  (December 27, 2012)

Season 2: Time Travel (2013) 

11. Time Travel  (April 17, 2013)

12. The Middle Ages  (April 17, 2013)

13. The Renaissance  (May 4, 2013)

14. Pirate Ship  (May 18, 2013)

15. Ancient Egypt  (June 1, 2013)

16. Ancient Greece  (June 15, 2013)

17. The Stone Age  (June 29, 2013)

18. Disco Era  (August 8, 2013)

19. Wild West  (December 11, 2013)

20. Home Sweet Home  (December 11, 2013)

Season 3: Unexpected Adventure (2013-2014) 

21. Unexpected Adventure  (December 13, 2013)

22. Forest  (December 19, 2013)

23. Sandy Dam  (December 24, 2013)

24. Junkyard  (January 5, 2014)

25. City Park  (January 25, 2014)

26. Underground  (February 8, 2014)

27. Fruit Market  (June 19, 2014)

28. Bakery  (December 8, 2014)

Season 4: Magic (2016) 

29. Mysterious House  (March 15, 2016)

30. Mad Tea Party  (April 1, 2016)

31. The Magic Lamp  (April 16, 2016)

32. A Tangled Story  (April 30, 2016)

33. Ice Cave  (May 14, 2016)

34. Puppeteer  (May 28, 2016)

35. The Chest  (June 11, 2016)

36. The Beanstalk  (June 27, 2016)

37. Little Red Hungry Hood  (July 11, 2016)

38. Magic Hat  (July 22, 2016)

Season 5: Around the World (2016-2017) 

39. Football  (August 19, 2016)

40. Master Nom  (September 2, 2016)

41. Cycle Race  (September 16, 2016)

42. Sweet Duel  (September 30, 2016)

43. Sweet Recipe  (October 14, 2016)

44. Halloween Special  (October 28, 2016)

45. Woods Chase  (November 11, 2016)

46. The Sunken Ship  (November 25, 2016)

47. At The Fair  (December 9, 2016)

48. Christmas Special  (December 20, 2016)

49. Winter Park  (December 30, 2016)

Season 6: Video Blog (2017) 

50. Unpacking  (January 27, 2017)

51. Scrapbooking  (St. Valentine's Special) (February 10, 2017)

52. Workout  (February 24, 2017)

53. Unexpected 360° Guest  (March 24, 2017)

54. Easter  (April 7, 2017)

55. Experiments  (April 21, 2017)

56. Pranks  (May 5, 2017)

57. Skateboarding  (May 19, 2017)

58. Makeup Tutorial  (June 2, 2017)

59. Shopping  (June 16, 2017)

60. Cooking Time  (June 30, 2017)

Season 7: Dream Job (2017) 

61. Astronaut  (August 18, 2017)

62. Magician  (September 1, 2017)

63. Mailman  (September 15, 2017)

64. Waiter  (September 29, 2017)

65. Farmer  (October 13, 2017)

66. Mad Scientist  (October 27, 2017)

67. Detective  (November 10, 2017)

68. Engineer  (November 24, 2017)

69. Actor  (December 8, 2017)

70. Santa  (Christmas Special)  (December 22, 2017)

Series 2: Super-Noms (2018-2019)

Season 8: Super-Noms Season 1 (2018) 

71. Super-Noms  (January 19, 2018)

72. Omzilla  (February 2, 2018)

73. St. Valentine's Day  (February 14, 2018)

74. Ferret Robber  (March 2, 2018)

75. UFO  (March 16, 2018)

76. Easter Bunny  (March 23, 2020)

77. Trash Monster  (April 13, 2018)

78. Lonely Warrior  (April 27, 2018)

79. On the Edge  (May 11, 2018)

80. Evil Snowman  (May 25, 2018)

Season 9: Super-Noms Season 2 (2018) 

81. The Great Escape  (June 22, 2018)

82. Friends to the Rescue  (July 6, 2018)

83. Electro Ferret  (July 20, 2018)

84. Cupid's Arrows  (August 2, 2018)

85. Shrunken Noms  (August 31, 2018)

86. Piranha Man  (September 14, 2018)

87. Cactus Attack  (September 28, 2018)

88. Cinema Wars  (October 5, 2018)

89. Double Trouble  (October 12, 2018)

90. Ghost Terror (Halloween)  (October 19, 2018)

Season 10: Super-Noms Season 3 (2018-2019) 

91. Emergency Help  (November 2, 2018)

92. Burnman  (November 9, 2018)

93. Hocus Pocus  (November 16, 2018)

94. Bigfoot  (November 23, 2018)

95. Mechanic Rodeo  (November 30, 2018)

96. Digital Adventures  (December 7, 2018)

97. Saving Christmas  (December 14, 2018)

98. Grandma's Power  (December 21, 2018)

99. Bookworm  (December 28, 2018)

100. Snow Castles  (January 4, 2019)

Season 11: Super-Noms Season 4 (2019) 

101. Grocery Store Brawl  (January 18, 2019)

102. Festive Firework  (January 25, 2019)

103. Cupid's Bow  (February 8, 2019)

104. Robo Butler  (February 15, 2019)

105. Wormy Apple  (February 22, 2019)

106. Holi Monkey  (March 1, 2019)

107. Brazilian Carnival  (March 8, 2019)

108. Electric Horror  (March 15, 2019)

109. Interrupted Ceremony, Part 1  (March 22, 2019)

110. Interrupted Ceremony, Part 2  (March 29, 2019)

Season 12: Super-Noms Season 5 (2019) 

111. Easter Stir  (April 12, 2019)

112. Neighbours' War  (April 19, 2019)

113. Rugrats on the run  (April 26, 2019)

114. Ice-cream rain  (May 3, 2019)

115. Risk Race  (May 10, 2019)

116. Laserboy  (May 17, 2019)

117. Sneaky Seal  (May 24, 2019)

118. Save Kitten!  (May 31, 2019)

119. Evil Spray Paint  (June 7, 2019)

120. T-u-r-t-l-e  (June 14, 2019)

Season 13: Super-Noms Season 6 (2019) 

121. Parrot Prank  (August 16, 2019)

122. Giant Professor  (August 23, 2019)

123. The Lost Ball  (August 30, 2019)

124. Heroes Unite  (September 6, 2019)

125. Time Controller  (September 13, 2019)

126. Baby Om Nelle  (September 20, 2019)

127. Robo-Noms, Part 1  (September 27, 2019)

128. Robo-Noms, Part 2  (October 4, 2019)

129. Portals Attack  (October 11, 2019)

130. Horror Story  (October 18, 2019)

Season 14: Super-Noms Season 7 (2019) 

131. Piñata Party  (October 25, 2019)

132. Achoo!  (November 1, 2019)

133. Tomb Noms  (November 8, 2019)

134. Superclothes  (November 15, 2019)

135. Nightmare Cruise  (November 22, 2019)

136. Happy Birthday!  (November 29, 2019)

137. Poisonous clouds  (December 6, 2019)

138. Oh Christmas Tree  (December 13, 2019)

139. Prehistoric Nom  (December 20, 2019)

140. Magic Mic  (December 27, 2019)

Series 3: Nibble-Nom (2020)

Season 15: Nibble-Nom Season 1 (2020) 

141. Nibble-Nom  (Bath Time & Pirates)  (February 21, 2020)

142. Sand Castle  (March 6, 2020)

143. Tea Party  (March 13, 2020)

144. Bedtime Play  (March 20, 2020)

145. Cake Thieves  (March 27, 2020)

146. Magic Fails  (April 3, 2020)

147. Sandbox Builders  (April 10, 2020)

148. Playground Fun  (April 17, 2020)

149. Vacuuming the City  (April 24, 2020)

150. The Wild West  (May 1, 2020)

Season 16: Nibble-Nom Season 2 (2020) 

151. Draw the World  (May 15, 2020)

152. Lunch Space Wars  (May 22, 2020)

153. Stinkysaurus Nom  (May 29, 2020)

154. Turbo Nom  (June 5, 2020)

155. An apple a day  (June 12, 2020)

156. Detective Nom  (June 19, 2020)

157. Fashion Show  (June 26, 2020)

158. Watermelon Farm  (July 3, 2020)

159. Nomerella  (July 10, 2022)

160. Platformer  (July 17, 2020)

Season 17: Nibble-Nom Season 3 (2020) 

161. Eruption Disruption  (September 4, 2020)

162. Pearl Treasure  (September 18, 2020)

163. Tree House  (October 2, 2020)

164. Stellar Sorting  (October 30, 2020)

165. Tiny Ghost  (October 16, 2020)

166. Goldilocks Nom  (November 13, 2020)

167. Snow Fight  (November 27, 2020)

168. Saved Christmas  (December 4, 2020)

169. Scout Noms  (December 18, 2020)

170. Nom Olympics  (December 25, 2020)

Series 4: Om Nom Cafe (2021)

Season 18: Om Nom Cafe Season 1 (2021) 

171. A Sweet Start  (January 29, 2021)

172. Cake for Two  (February 12, 2021)

173. Cheese Power  (February 26, 2021)

174. Squeaky Clean  (March 12, 2021)

175. Easter Eggs  (March 26, 2021)

176. Competitor  (June 25, 2021)

177. Sushi  (April 23, 2021)

178. Wash Up!  (May 7, 2021)

179. Wonder Mixer  (May 21, 2021)

180. Mega Meal  (June 4, 2021)

Season 19: Om Nom Cafe Season 2 (2021) 

181. Back to school  (August 20, 2021)

182. Chef Level  (September 3, 2021)

183. Chef Hat  (September 10, 2021)

184. Tiny Sabotage (September 17, 2021)

185. Happy Day  (September 24, 2021)

186. Nuts For Coco  (October 1, 2021)

187. Hot Competition  (October 8, 2021)

188. Sweet Nom!  (October 15, 2021)

189. Spooky Delivery  (October 22, 2021)

190. Oh My Cake  (October 29, 2021)

Series 5: New Neighbors (2021-present)

Season 20: New Neighbors Season 1 (2021-2022) 

191. No Tears  (November 12, 2021)

192. Pre-Loved Gift  (November 19, 2021)

193. Nom Pranks  (November 26, 2021)

194. Sporty Nom  (December 3, 2021)

195. Xmas Neighbor  (December 10, 2021)

196. Monster Gaming  (December 17, 2021)

197. Talent Show  (December 24, 2021)

198. Arts & Crafts  (December 31, 2021)

199. Snowy Fun  (January 7, 2022)

200. Appearance Matters  (January 14, 2022)

Season 21: New Neighbors Season 2 (2022) 

201. Heart-Shaped  (February 11, 2022)

202. Om Nom Game  (February 18, 2022)

203. Nom-bit Games  (February 25, 2022)

204. Common Playground  (March 11, 2022)

205. Wake Up  (March 18, 2022)

206. PhotoNom  (March 25, 2022)

207. Sleepover  (April 1, 2022)

208. Egg-sellent!  (April 8, 2022)

209. Game On  (April 15, 2022)

210. Nomtastic Weather  (April 22, 2022)

Season 22: New Neighbors Season 3 (2022) 

211. Sports for All  (May 20, 2022)

212. Dress Up  (June 3, 2022)

213. Learn like Nom  (August 19, 2022)

Special School : Back to school  (August 26, 2022)

214. Sunny Day  (September 2, 2022)
 
215. Lunch Time  (September 9, 2022)

216. TV friends  (September 16, 2022)

217. Birthday Monster (September 23, 2022)

218. Paper Games (September 30, 2022)

Special : Fun Play  (October 7, 2022)

219. Board Gamer (October 12, 2022)

220. Beach Fun (October 14, 2022)

Season 23: New Neighbors Season 4 (2022) 

221. Spooky Time (October 21, 2022)

222. SmartNom (October 28, 2022)

223. Nom on Wheels (November 4, 2022)

224. Hot Days (November 11, 2022)

225. Weather Tricks (November 19, 2022)

226. Being a Good Friend is Important! (November 26, 2022)

227. Clean Up! (December 2, 2022)

228. Nommy Holidays (December 9, 2022)

229. Picnic (December 16, 2022)

230. Om Nom says Let IT SNOW! (December 23, 2022)

References

2011 web series debuts
British children's animated action television series
British children's animated adventure television series
British children's animated comedy television series
British children's animated fantasy television series
British children's animated superhero television series
British children's animated comic science fiction television series
Russian children's animated adventure television series
Russian children's animated comedy television series
Russian children's animated fantasy television series
Russian children's animated comic science fiction television series
British comedy web series
YouTube original programming
Works with live action and animation
British animated web series
Animated television series without speech
Animated series based on video games